Nokia 101 is an ultra-basic dual-SIM mobile phone by Nokia. It is primarily geared for users in developing countries, or for people who need a simple communications device with FM radio and music playback.

This phone model is not to be confused with the 1992 Nokia 101.

Features
The phone runs on a Li-ion battery that can last up to 768 hours on standby, and with talk time of up to 8 hours and 30 minutes.

The phone can play standard MP3 files with a bitrate greater than 32 bit/s, with advertised 36 hours of playback time.

The phonebook can hold up to 500 entries.

Variance
This phone is available in only two colors: Phantom Black and Coral Red.

References

External links

101
Mobile phones introduced in 2011